Yngvar Sonnichsen (March 9, 1873 – July 1938) was a Norwegian born, American artist and painter known especially for his portraits, landscapes and murals.

Background
Yngvar Sonnichsen was born in Christiania, (now Oslo, Norway to S.P. and Inga Mathea Sonnichsen. He studied at the Norwegian Institute of Technology in Trondhjem earning a civil engineering degree. He studied art at the Norwegian National Academy of Craft and Art Industry with Norwegian artists Oscar Wergeland and Eilif Peterssen. Later, from 1895 to 1899, he attended the Académie Julian in Paris, studying  with William-Adolphe Bouguereau and Jean-Joseph Benjamin-Constant.

Career
In 1904, Sonnichsen immigrated to Saint John, New Brunswick, Canada before moving to Seattle, Washington in 1908. In 1917, Sonnichsen and his brother architect Sønke Engelhart Sonnichsen, designed  and decorated a Seattle lodge with original oil-on-canvas murals and painting.  Now Raisbeck Performance Hall at Cornish College of the Arts, in 1975 the building was designated as a Seattle historic landmark. The murals are now located in the Leif Erikson Lodge of the Sons of Norway in Ballard, Washington. Today, his works are also on display in municipal galleries in Oslo, Arendal and Laurvik, Norway, Decorah, Iowa  and Seattle, Washington.

Honors
First Prize at the International Exposition in Saint John, New Brunswick, Canada (1906)
Gold and silver medals at the Alaska-Yukon-Pacific Exposition in Seattle (1909)
Honorable mention at the Northwest Artists’ Annual Exhibition, Seattle (1920 and 1927)

References

Other sources
Who's Who In Washington State (Seattle: Arthur H. Allen, 1927)
Selnes, Johan. Yngvar Sonnichsen (Nordmanns-forbundet. translators Jim Skurdal, Kari Grønningsaeter and Øyvind Gulliksen, Vol. 7  237–239. July 1929)
Kreisman, Lawrence and Glenn Mason The Arts and Crafts Movement in the Pacific Northwest (Portland, OR: Timber Press, Inc. 2007)
Leander, Kristine  Norwegian Seattle,  Images of America: Washington (San Francisco, CA: Arcadia Publishing. 2008)
Bjork, Kenneth O. Saga in Steel and Concrete - Norwegian Engineers in America  (Northfield, MN: Norwegian-American Historical Association. 1947)

External links
 Portrait of Yngvar Sonnichsen

1873 births
1938 deaths
Artists from Oslo
Norwegian Institute of Technology alumni
Oslo National Academy of the Arts alumni
Académie Julian alumni
19th-century American painters
American male painters
20th-century American painters
Norwegian emigrants to the United States
19th-century American male artists
20th-century American male artists